Donald H. "Duck" Richardson, Sr. (September 16, 1935 – September 4, 2011) was an American boys' basketball coach at Southwest Magnet High School in Macon, Georgia from 1971 to 1990. During that period, he coached future NBA players Jeff Malone, Ivano Newbill, Norm Nixon, and Sharone Wright. He also coached several players who went on to play Division I college basketball, such as Eric Manuel. A total of 92 Southwest players were awarded collegiate athletic scholarships during his tenure.

His career achievements included a 463–90 record (83.7% winning percentage), which set a school record for number of wins. Richardson led Southwest to fifteen subregional championships, ten regional championships, six state championships, and one national championship (1979). Under his management, Southwest boys' basketball teams never had a losing season.

Coach Richardson was the husband of Jacquelyn Richardson.  Together they raised 4 children; 3 Sons - Stan Richardson, Don Z. Richardson, Donald H. Richardson Jr., and a daughter, Linda Richardson.

Prior to Richardson's death, Southwest High School's gymnasium basketball court was named in his honor.

Awards
National coach of the Year: 1979
State of Georgia Coach of the Year
Region Coach of the Year
Middle Georgia Coach of the Year
Head coach of the All American Team in the Dapper Dan Basketball Classic
Steve Schmidt Award
Georgia Sports Hall of Fame inductee: 2007

References

 Duck 30 years Later
 Coach Richardson's Legacy
 Northeast Versus Southwest Duck Richardson Memorial Alumni Game
"Duck's Boys"
30 Years Later

1936 births
2011 deaths
African-American basketball coaches
High school basketball coaches in the United States
Sportspeople from Macon, Georgia
20th-century African-American sportspeople
21st-century African-American people